Alpine is a census-designated place in Apache County, Arizona, United States, in Bush Valley in the east central part of the state. As of the 2010 census, it had a population of 145. It is located near the eastern border of the state.

History
Located approximately 75 miles south of the Navajo Nation, Alpine was settled in 1876 by Anderson Bush, a European-American who built a log house there. He originally used it as a trading post known as "Fort Bush". Bush sold his holdings in 1879 to William Maxwell and Fred Hamblin, Mormon settlers who established the town as a Mormon community. They named the community for its lofty elevation.

The Alpine post office has the ZIP code of 85920.

Geography

Alpine is near the headwaters of the San Francisco River and six miles from the New Mexico border. Alpine is a popular destination for hunting, fishing, and camping. As of 1960, it was the highest place in the United States where farming was successfully conducted.

Demographics

Alpine first appeared on the 1900 U.S. Census as the Alpine Precinct of Apache County. 95 residents in 17 households. It also was recorded  in 1930. In that census it had a white majority. All county precincts were combined into three districts in 1940. Alpine's population was 165 in 1940. The 1960 census estimated 300 persons. In 2010, it was defined as a census-designated place (CDP).

Climate
Alpine has a warm-summer Mediterranean climate (Köppen Csb) influence by its very high altitude and the North American Monsoon, which brings frequent thunder showers during the summer. Although temperatures are generally comfortable during the daytime, the sun is very intense and at night frosts have occurred even in summer and are an almost daily occurrence from October to May.

Winters are cold, with storms bringing precipitation mostly in the form of snow. Because Alpine is on the eastern end of the Mogollon Rim, it experiences a rain shadow from the White Mountains and receives less snowfall than points west at a similar elevation.

Government and infrastructure
The U.S. Postal Service operates the Alpine Post Office on U.S. Route 191.

Attractions

 Apache-Sitgreaves National Forest
 The Coronado Trail Scenic Byway, a  segment along U.S. Route 191 (formerly US-666) between Springerville and Clifton, Arizona
 Escudilla Mountain, a pine and aspen-covered mesa, popular for hiking, horseback-riding, and viewing fall colors

Education
The Alpine Elementary School District, operating Alpine Elementary School, serves Alpine.

The Apache County Library District operates the Alpine Public Library.

Picture gallery

See also

 List of census-designated places in Arizona
 Luna, New Mexico

References

External links

 Alpine Area Chamber of Commerce
 "Alpine" at White Mountains Online

White Mountains (Arizona)
Census-designated places in Apache County, Arizona
Populated places established in 1876
1876 establishments in Arizona Territory